The Quiksilver Pro Gold Coast 2016 was an event of the Association of Surfing Professionals for 2016 World Surf League.

This event was held from 10 to 21 March at Gold Coast, (Queensland, Australia) and contested by 36 surfers.

The tournament was won by Tyler Wright (AUS), who beat C.Conlogue (USA) in final.

Round 1

Round 2

Round 3

Round 4

Quarter finals

Semi finals

Final

References

Surfing competitions
2016 World Surf League
2016 in Australian sport
2016 in Australian women's sport
Sport on the Gold Coast, Queensland
Women's surfing